The 22nd Genie Awards were held in 2002 to honour films released in 2001. The ceremony was hosted by Brian Linehan.

In advance of the Genie Award ceremony on February 7, all of the Best Picture nominees were screened at the Bloor Cinema in the week of January 26 to 30. All except the three-hour Atanarjuat: The Fast Runner were preceded by one of the four Best Live Action Short Drama nominees.

Nominees and winners
The Genie Award winner in each category is shown in bold text.

References

22
Genie
Genie